The NH series of Honda scooters was sold worldwide beginning in 1983, in 50, 80, 90, 100 and 125cc versions.  All models have an air-cooled two-stroke engine with CDI ignition. All models except the Lead 50 have leading link front suspension, electric and kick start, and a fuel gauge. The Lead 50 has a traditional telescopic fork front suspension and only electric start. All models have drum brakes and CVT transmission.

Models
Aero (USA, 1983–85)
Lead (Outside USA, 1983–87)
Vision (Outside USA, 1987–94)
Mascot (Canada)
American regulations in 1986 required any motorcycle over 50cc  to be four stroke to combat air pollution.

Kinetic (DX, ZX, Y2K Etc..) (India, 1984–2007)
Dio (India, 2001-present)

Engine sizes
NH 50  (49cc)
NH 80  (79cc)
NH 90  (89cc)
NH 100 (96cc)
NH 125 (124cc)
NH 150 (149cc)
There is also a more modern Lead in 100cc, 110cc and 125cc versions.

Regional variations
There were other regional variations as well as going by a different name in the USA. Most notably, the headlights were different on the early European models. The front handlebar moulding was later changed to be common across all models, allowing the same headlights to be used. Although the specific light arrangements still vary because of the regulations in different countries. Stickers, badges and mirrors are also different across regional versions.

Honda Dio 
Manufactured by Honda Motorcycle and Scooter India, Honda Dio is a 110cc scooter introduced in 2001 in India and exported with the same brand name to 11 countries including Nepal, Sri Lanka, Bangladesh, Mexico and Columbia. It has a 110cc, 4 stroke, air cooled engine and has both electric start and kick start. It's tank can hold 6 Litres of Petrol with 1 litre in reserve. India Today magazine named Honda Dio as the 4th most selling Scooter in June 2021. Honda India introduced Dio Repsol, a sporty looking scooter introduced to celebrate 800 victories in MotoGP.

Other manufacturers
During the 1980s, Honda invested in non-Japanese motorcycle manufacturing – most notably they bought a large percentage of French company Peugeot, which resulted in Peugeot Motocycles. Elsewhere, the Kinetic Motor Company from India, which resulted in Kinetic Honda. Both of these joint ventures saw the NH series given various degrees of cosmetic overhaul and released as a number of different models. Peugeot released the SC 50, SC 50L, SC 80L and SX 80L whilst Kinetic Honda released the EX, DX, ZX (100cc, 2-stroke), the ZX Zoom (110cc, 2-stroke) and the 4S model (113.5cc, 4-stroke).

References
Sources

External links

NH series
Motor scooters
Two-stroke motorcycles
Motorcycles introduced in 1983